Simon Alangde Asabo is a Ghanaian politician and was the former member of parliament for the Bongo constituency in the Upper East region of Ghana in the second parliament of the 4th republic of Ghana.

Early life 
Asabo was born at Bongo in the Upper East Region of Ghana.

Career 
Alangde is an accountant by profession.

Politics 
Alangde was elected to represent the Bongo constituency in the 2nd parliament of the 4th republic of Ghana in the 1996 Ghanaian general elections. He was elected on the ticket of the National Democratic Congress. He took over from Gaaga Akayeri Azitariga also of the National Democratic Congress who represented the constituency in the first parliament of the 4th republic of Ghana. Alangde lost his seat to Albert Abongo in the subsequent elections of 2000.

Elections 
Alangde was elected with 22695 votes out of 30750 valid votes cast representing 73.8% of the total valid votes cast. He was elected over Emmanuel Akobire Adosenaba of the People's Convention party, Ayamga Joseph Leo of the National Convention Party  and John Adobongo Atanga of the People's National Convention. These obtained 8.7%, 3.15% and 14.34% respectively of the total valid votes cast.

References 

National Democratic Congress (Ghana) politicians
Ghanaian MPs 1997–2001
Living people
People from Upper East Region
Year of birth missing (living people)